The 2013–14 Real Betis season was the 79th season in club history.

Competitions

La Liga

Europa League

Group stage

Bracket

Squad

Out on loan

Sources

Real Betis
Real Betis seasons